West Banda is a minor Banda language, spoken by 10,000 or so people.

Dialects
Dialects are Dakpa, Gbaga-Nord (Gbaga-2), Gbi, Vita, and Wojo (Hodjo), as reported by Ethnologue and Moñino (1988).

Dákpá speakers live in some villages near the Sara people of Nyango; clans are Yangbà and Dèkò.

Phonology

Consonants

Vowels 

Vowel tones in West Banda are rising /ǎ/, falling /â/, mid /ā/, low /à/, and high /á/.

References

Languages of the Central African Republic
Languages of South Sudan
Banda languages